Dylan Easton (born 6 April 1994) is a Scottish footballer who plays as an attacking midfielder or second striker for Raith Rovers.

Easton has previously played with Livingston, Berwick Rangers, St Johnstone, Elgin City, Clyde and Forfar Athletic, Kelty Hearts, Airdrieonians, as well as Arbroath and Dumbarton on loan.

Career

Livingston
Easton signed for Livingston in July 2011 from Hutchison Vale. A member of their under 19 squad, he made his first team debut aged 17 as a substitute against Partick Thistle on 11 February 2012.

St Johnstone
In 2013, Easton signed a pre-contract agreement with Scottish Premier League club St Johnstone. Easton left the club by mutual consent in August 2015.

Dumbarton (loan)
He joined Dumbarton on loan in January 2015 and made his debut in a 5–1 defeat to Livingston.

Elgin City
In October 2015, Easton signed a contract agreement until the summer 2016 after he left St Johnstone by mutual consent in August 2015. Easton's attacking instincts produced many goal assists during his short time with the club. He was a fans favourite with several his fine displays, and was one of the star players of the season. Easton helped to lead the club to a 2nd-place finish and the promotion the play-offs. He was also named in the Ladbrokes Scottish League Two Team of the Season for 2015–16.

Clyde
On 28 May 2016, it was announced that Easton had signed for Scottish League Two club Clyde. After a positive start to his career at Clyde, Easton was ruled out for an extended period after rupturing his cruciate ligament in Clyde's 3–2 win over Arbroath.
However, Easton still managed to win Clyde FC Goal of the Season 2016–17. The midfielder's excellent strike against Montrose in August was the most popular from a shortlist of six, in an online vote. The goal was also included in the shortlist for the PFA Scotland Goal of the Season. He left Clyde in June 2017.

Forfar Athletic
He signed a two-year contract with Forfar Athletic on 20 June 2017.

Kelty Hearts
Easton joined Lowland League club Kelty Hearts in June 2019.

Airdrieonians
On 11 June 2021, Easton signed for Scottish League One side Airdrieonians.

Easton helped the side to the Championship play offs scoring 8 goals and 12 assists, making him the highest assister in League 1.
He won Airdrieonians Player of the Season and the Scottish PFA League 1 player of the year as well as being named in Scotlands PFA League 1 Team of the Year.

Raith Rovers

On 26th May 2022, Easton joined Scottish Championship side Raith Rovers on a 2 year deal.

Career statistics

Honours
Kelty Hearts
Lowland League: 2019–20

Airdrieonians 
Scotland PFA League 1 Player of the Year Award 2021-22

References

External links

1994 births
Living people
Scottish footballers
Association football forwards
Livingston F.C. players
Berwick Rangers F.C. players
St Johnstone F.C. players
Dumbarton F.C. players
Elgin City F.C. players
Clyde F.C. players
Forfar Athletic F.C. players
Airdrieonians F.C. players
Scottish Football League players
Scottish Professional Football League players
Kelty Hearts F.C. players
Lowland Football League players
Raith Rovers F.C. players